The Cotton Merchants' Gate is one of the gates of the al-Aqsa Compound.
Its intricate eastern façade makes it one of the most recognizable and "the grandest of the Haram gates".

History 

It was built under of the supervision of Tankiz in 1336, during the time of Sultan an-Nasir Muhammad of the Mamluk Sultanate. 
The 14th-century historian al-ʿUmarī explained that the gate was constructed in order to link the compound with the 's market-street, 
which was also built by Tankiz around that time: in 1336-37.

Description 

There are ten descending steps to reach the gate.

Its eastern façade faces the inside the compound and features a recess with a semi-dome. The semi-dome has a gently pointed arch, and its voussoir has ablaq (alternating) masonry of red and beige bricks. It also contains five rows of muqarnas. 

Between the semi-dome and the door is a trefoil-shaped arch, with ablaq patterns in black and beige bricks. Above the door is a straight stone lintel, which is composed of three external pieces. 
There used to be a small window in the trefoil arch's tympanum, but the window was blocked in 1927.

Environs 

Ablution Gate is nearby and to the south. 
These are the closest gates to the Dome of the Rock, with the Fountain of Qaytbay near the gates.

Immediately north of the gate is the Khātūniyya Madrasa, and even farther north is the Arghūniyya Madrasa. North of the madrasas is the Iron Gate.

References

External links
Photos of the Cotton Merchants' Gate at the Manar al-Athar photo archive

Gates in Jerusalem's Old City Walls